Kardegar Mahalleh (also Romanized as Kārdegar Maḩalleh and Kārdgar Maḩalleh; also known as Kārgar Maḩalleh) is a village in Baladeh Rural District, Khorramabad District, Tonekabon County, Mazandaran Province, Iran. At the 2006 census, its population was 1,312, in 364 families.
بعد انقلاب به شهید آباد معروف شد

References 

Populated places in Tonekabon County